Pterolophia bisbinodula is a species of beetle in the family Cerambycidae. It was described by Quedenfeldt in 1883, originally under the genus Theticus. It has a wide distribution in Africa.

References

bisbinodula
Beetles described in 1883